State of Emergency: The Third World Invasion and Conquest of America is a 2006 book by American conservative Patrick Buchanan, in which the author criticizes the large number of illegal immigrants entering the United States, alleging that the influx constitutes a crisis with profound cultural, political, and economic impact on the country.

The book also contains a chapter called "Eurabia", which states that "Islamization of Europe is an unavoidable consequence, indeed, an inevitability, once Europe ceased to reproduce itself."

Publication history
 Thomas Dunne Books (US), hardcover, 2006, 
 St. Martin's Griffin (US), paperback, 2007,

References

External links
 State of Emergency online ebook.

2006 non-fiction books
Books about foreign relations of the United States
Books about immigration to the United States
Books by Patrick J. Buchanan
English-language books
Eurabia
Paleoconservative publications